Caroline Alexandra van Eck  (born 22 July 1959) is a Dutch art historian and academic, specialising in the art and architecture of the early modern period. Since 2016, she has been Professor of Art History at the University of Cambridge and a Fellow of King's College, Cambridge. She was Professor of Art and Architecture before 1800 at Leiden University from 2006 to 2016, and previously taught at Vrije Universiteit Amsterdam and the University of Groningen. She was the 2017 Slade Professor of Fine Art at the University of Oxford.

Honours
In March 2014, van Eck was awarded the 2013 Descartes-Huygens Prize by the Frech Académie des Sciences Morales et Politiques.

In December 2014, van Eck was appointed a Chevalier (Knight) of the Ordre National du Mérite by the President of France. She was awarded the Grand Prix du Rayonnement de la Littérature et Culture Françaises by the Académie française in 2015.

In 2020 van Eck was elected a fellow of the Academia Europaea and of the British Academy.

Selected works

References

1959 births
Living people
Dutch art historians
Dutch women historians
Architecture academics
Women art historians
Academics of the University of Cambridge
Academic staff of Leiden University
Academic staff of Vrije Universiteit Amsterdam
Academic staff of the University of Groningen
Slade Professors of Fine Art (University of Oxford)
Knights of the Ordre national du Mérite